"If I Can't Have You" is a song by Canadian singer Shawn Mendes. It was released as the lead single (sixth overall) from the deluxe edition of Mendes' self-titled third studio album through Island Records on May 3, 2019. The music video was released the same day. "If I Can't Have You" has reached number one in Hungary and China, as well as the top five in Australia, Austria, Canada, the Czech Republic, Denmark, Malaysia, New Zealand, Scotland, Slovakia, and the United States.

Background
Mendes told Zane Lowe on the Beats 1 radio show that out of the 45 songs he has written in the last six months, which are stylistically "all over the place" and have "different vibes", "If I Can't Have You" was "the one consistently every time I played for myself and for friends and family was giving people that smile".

Promotion
Mendes announced the release through his social media on May 1. He shared a link to the promotional website canthaveyou.com, which redirects to his webstore and offers the single as a 7-inch vinyl, cassette and CD single, with each format available in three versions containing a unique voice memo from Mendes. He performed the song for the first time during Saturday Night Live on May 4, 2019.

Commercial performance 
"If I Can't Have You" debuted at number two on both the Canadian Hot 100 and the US Billboard Hot 100, behind "Old Town Road" by Lil Nas X. It was Mendes' highest-charting hit in both countries at the time surpassing 2015's "Stitches", which peaked at number 4 in the US.
"Señorita" became his highest-charting single later in the year.

Music video
The music video was released on May 3, 2019, via the singer's official Vevo channel on YouTube. A lyric video was also released on May 6, 2019.

Track listing

Each version of the 7-inch, cassette and CD single contains one of three voice memos from Mendes.

Credits and personnel
Credits adapted from Tidal.

 Shawn Mendes – vocals, songwriter, producer, programmer, guitar
 Teddy Geiger – songwriter, producer, drums, guitar, keyboards, programmer
 Scott Harris – songwriter, additional producer, guitar
 Nate Mercereau – songwriter, additional producer, guitar, bass guitar, piano
 Ojivolta – songwriter, additional producer
 Ray 'August Grant' Jacobs – backing vocals
 Raul Cubina – drums, percussion, programmer
 Ryan Svendsen – trumpet, flugelhorn
 Mark Williams – guitar, keyboards, programmer
 Zubin Thakkar – engineer, studio personnel
 George Seara – mixer, recording engineer, studio personnel
 Mike Gnocato – assistant mixer, studio personnel

Charts

Weekly charts

Year-end charts

Certifications

Release history

References

2019 singles
2019 songs
Black-and-white music videos
Island Records singles
Shawn Mendes songs
Songs written by Scott Harris (songwriter)
Songs written by Shawn Mendes
Songs written by Teddy Geiger